Demanietta renongensis is a waterfall crab found in the Malay Peninsula: Southern Thailand, ranging from Chumphon to Trang, and Peninsular Malaysia. It is a common and abundant species.

References

Potamoidea
Arthropods of Malaysia
Arthropods of Thailand
Crustaceans described in 1904
Freshwater crustaceans of Asia